Nowellia is a genus of liverwort in the family Cephaloziaceae. 

The genus name of Nowellia is in honour of William Nowell (1880-1968), who was a British botanist (Mycology), who researched in Trinidad and wrote a book,  'Diseases of crop-plants in the Lesser Antille' (1923).

Species
As accepted by GBIF;

 Nowellia aciliata 
 Nowellia bicornis 
 Nowellia borneensis 
 Nowellia caledonica 
 Nowellia caribbeania 
 Nowellia curvifolia 
 Nowellia dominicensis 
 Nowellia evansii 
 Nowellia indica 
 Nowellia langii 
 Nowellia orientalis 
 Nowellia pusilla 
 Nowellia reedii 
 Nowellia wrightii 
 Nowellia yunckeri

References

Cephaloziaceae
Jungermanniales genera
Taxonomy articles created by Polbot